was a district in Hiroshima Prefecture, Japan.

As of 2003, the district had an estimated population of 29,682 and a density of 181.49 persons per km2. The total area was 163.55 km2.

Former towns and villages
 Kui
 Mitsugi
 Mukaishima

Mergers
 On March 22, 2005 - the town of Kui, along with the town of Daiwa (from Kamo District), and the town of Hongō (from Toyota District), was merged into the expanded city of Mihara.
 On March 28, 2005 - the towns of Mitsugi and Mukaishima were merged into the expanded city of Onomichi. Mitsugi District was dissolved as a result of this merger.

Former districts of Hiroshima Prefecture